

Wigmund was a medieval Bishop of Dorchester.

Wigmund was consecrated between 893 and 900 and died between 903 and 909.

There is some confusion between Wigmund and another bishop, Wilferth, reportedly the bishop of Lichfield.  The surviving charters do not explicitly specify which was bishop of where; therefore, it may have been Wilferth who was bishop of Dorchester, and Wigmund the bishop of Lichfield.

Citations

References

External links
  (as Bishop of Dorchester)

10th-century English bishops
Bishops of Dorchester (Mercia)
900s deaths
Year of birth unknown
Year of death uncertain